is a Japanese professional footballer who plays as a central midfielder for J1 League club Avispa Fukuoka, on loan from Celtic and for the Japan national team. He has previously represented Japan at Under-19 and Under-23 youth levels.

Club career

Gamba Osaka
Ideguchi started his youth career at Aburayama Kameriazu. He joined the Gamba Osaka academy in 2009. He made his first team debut with Gamba Osaka in 2014, he joined J.League U22's on loan in 2014 to get first team experience.

During the 2016 JLeague season Ideguchi was named 'New Hero Award' and the prestigious 'Rookie of the Year' award for the JLeague. After almost ten years spent with Gamba Osaka between youth ranks and senior team he left the club after 60 appearances in the JLeague scoring 8 goals.

Leeds United
On 9 January 2018, Ideguchi joined Championship side Leeds United on a four-and-a-half year deal for an undisclosed fee.

Cultural Leonesa loan
The same day after signing for Leeds, he went on a half a season loan to Leeds's feeder team in Spain, Aspire Academy owned club Cultural Leonesa with the club wanting to ready Ideguchi for European style football. On 28 January 2018, Ideguchi made his debut for Cultural Leonesa against CA Osasuna in a 2–1 defeat.

Return to Leeds
After returning for the start of pre-season under new Leeds Head Coach Marcelo Bielsa, Ideguchi made his first appearance in a Leeds shirt when he started for Leeds in the pre-season friendly 1–1 draw against York City on 20 July 2018. Despite starting for Leeds in three of their pre-season friendlies, on 26 July 2018, Ideguchi was seemingly not given a shirt number for Leeds for the upcoming 2018–19 season for Leeds. However, the following day 27 July, he was listed with shirt number 16 shirt in the club's online store. By early August, Bielsa praised Ideguchi's professionalism and hard work since his joining Leeds United, but admitted he did not see him as first or second choice for any position, and indicated he did not think it would be fair to ask him to stay at the club.

Greuther Fürth loan
On 21 August 2018, Ideguchi joined 2. Bundesliga side Greuther Fürth on a season-long loan deal with an option to make the deal permanent. On 15 September, he scored on his Greuther Fürth debut in the 4–1 win against Holstein Kiel. On 30 September, he was substituted in a 1–0 win over Dynamo Dresden with what later was revealed to be a posterior cruciate ligament injury, expected to keep him out for most of the season.

Having spent the initial part of his rehabilitation in Japan, Ideguchi returned to Germany at the start of 2019. On 6 May 2019, he made his first competitive appearance after the injury, coming on as a substitute as Greuther Fürth lost 4–0 at home to 1. FC Köln.

In total, he made seven appearances, scoring one goal for Greuther Fürth in 2. Bundesliga, with Ideguchi missing the majority of the season due to his posterior cruciate ligament injury.

Gamba Osaka
On 5 August 2019, he rejoined Gamba Osaka.

Celtic

On 31 December 2021, Ideguchi was announced to have signed for Scottish Premiership club Celtic for an undisclosed fee.

On 17 January 2022, Ideguchi made his debut for the club in a 2–0 win against Hibernian in the Scottish Premiership. A few days later, Ideguchi would start in a Scottish Cup fourth round tie against Scottish League One side Alloa Athletic. While Celtic won 2–1 and progressed to the next round, he sustained a serious injury and was forced off late in the game due to a strong challenge from Mouhamed Niang.

International career

Japan under-23's
After featuring for Japan U19, in 2016, Ideguchi was promoted to Japan U23's and was part of the Japan U23's that won the AFC U-23 Championship on 31 January 2016, he played in the final for Japan U23's in a 3–2 victory against South Korea U23.

Japan senior team
Ideguchi got his first call up to the senior Japan squad for matches against Oman and Saudi Arabia in November 2016. On 31 August 2017, he scored the second goal when Japan beat Australia 2–0 and qualified for the 2018 World Cup in the process. On 9 December 2017, Ideguchi scored the winner for Japan in a 1–0 victory against North Korea in the 2017 EAFF E-1 Football Championship.

On 15 March 2018, Vahid Halilhodzic surprisingly left out Ideguchi and Takuma Asano for the Japan squad for friendly matches with Mali and Ukraine in preparation for the 2018 FIFA World Cup, with Halilhodzic describing Ideguchi's lack of regular game time at Cultural Leonesa he proclaimed 'It makes me sad that Asano and Ideguchi are not playing, They were the heroes of our qualifying game against Australia. They haven't been chosen this time, and if things continue the way they are, there is a chance that they won't be chosen for the World Cup."

On 17 May 2018, Ideguchi was named in new Japan Manager's Akira Nishino's preliminary 35 man squad for Japan for the 2018 FIFA World Cup in Russia. Japan's squad was cut from 35 to 26, Ideguchi was named in the 26, and played for Japan on 31 May in a 2–0 defeat to Ghana in a pre-2018 FIFA World Cup friendly, the following day, the squad was cut from 26 to the final 23 man squad with Ideguchi missing out.

Career statistics

Club

International

Scores and results list Japan's goal tally first, score column indicates score after each Ideguchi goal.

Honours
Gamba Osaka

J. League Division 1: 2014
Emperor's Cup: 2014, 2015
J. League Cup: 2014
Japanese Super Cup: 2015

Japan U-23
 AFC U-23 Championship: 2016

Japan
 EAFF E-1 Football Championship: runners-up 2017

Individual	
 J.League Cup New Hero Award: 2016
 J.League Rookie of the Year: 2016	
 J.League Best XI: 2017

References

External links

1996 births
Living people
Association football people from Fukuoka Prefecture
Japanese footballers
Association football midfielders
Japan international footballers
Japan youth international footballers
Olympic footballers of Japan
Footballers at the 2016 Summer Olympics
J1 League players
J3 League players
Segunda División players
2. Bundesliga players
Gamba Osaka players
J.League U-22 Selection players
Cultural Leonesa footballers
Leeds United F.C. players
SpVgg Greuther Fürth players
Celtic F.C. players
Japanese expatriate footballers
Japanese expatriate sportspeople in Spain
Expatriate footballers in Spain
Japanese expatriate sportspeople in England
Expatriate footballers in England
Japanese expatriate sportspeople in Germany
Expatriate footballers in Germany
Japanese expatriate sportspeople in Scotland
Expatriate footballers in Scotland
Avispa Fukuoka players